Kenneth Rafe Mair (31 December 1931 – 9 October 2017) was a Canadian lawyer, political commentator, radio personality and politician in British Columbia, Canada. He served in the British Columbia Legislative Assembly as the member for Kamloops from 1975 to 1981 in the caucus of the Social Credit Party.

In his post-political career, Mair became a radio personality and political commentator, raising controversy for his views on both the Meech Lake and Charlottetown constitutional accords. He served as the plaintiff of the historic Supreme Court of Canada decision Rafe Mair v. Kari Simpson.

Early life
Mair was born in Vancouver and grew up in the neighbourhood of Kerrisdale. His mother was Frances Tyne (née Leigh), known as Frankie, and his father was Kenneth Frederick Robert Mair, a salesman born in Auckland, New Zealand. They had married in Vancouver 16 months earlier.

Mair became an avid fisherman and developed an interest in public affairs from his mother's work at The Province newspaper.

Mair entered the University of British Columbia (UBC) in 1949 and went on to law in 1953. He worked for a lumber company and then in the oil industry in Edmonton before spending three years as a claims adjuster with an insurance company.

In 1960, Mair began articling with Vancouver lawyer Tom Griffiths. Called to the bar in 1961, he handled many personal injury cases. He practiced law in Vancouver until 1968, when he moved to Kamloops to join the practice of his law school classmate Jarl Whist, a Liberal who had run twice unsuccessfully against Progressive Conservative MP E. Davie Fulton.

Political career 
His electoral career began with his election to Kamloops city council in the early 1970s. Previously involved with the Liberal Party, he was an opponent of the NDP government of premier Dave Barrett. He won the Social Credit nomination for Kamloops in May 1975, going on to defeat NDP incumbent Gerry Anderson in the December election by 14,639 votes to 10,975. Mair won re-election four years later by 3,309 votes. He held the seat until retiring from politics in 1981; the seat was taken over by Claude Richmond, also of the Social Credit Party.

Mair served in Premier Bill Bennett's cabinet in a variety of portfolios, including health and education. During the negotiations in 1980 and 1981 to patriate the Constitution of Canada, he was BC's chief delegate on constitutional matters.

Media personality 
In 1981, Mair left government and served as a radio talk show host in Vancouver at CJOR. The station fired Mair in 1984, replacing him with former premier Dave Barrett. Mair moved to rival CKNW.

In the early 1990s, he gained national notoriety and support alike for his role as an outspoken opponent of the Meech Lake and Charlottetown constitutional accords.

Despite high ratings, his show was cancelled by CKNW in 2003, and he was subsequently hired at CKBD (600 AM), an oldies station, to start a morning talk show until the show's ending in 2005. In the fall of 2005, he became a regular commentary guest on Omni Television's prime time current affairs program, The Standard (seen in Vancouver on CHNU-TV).

Mair contributed three commentaries a week until January 2006 when the Commentary segment of the program was axed. However, he continued his relationship with The Standard, guest-hosting the program from time to time. Until his death, he was as a regular columnist for a chain of community newspapers as well as for the online magazine The Tyee and often appeared nationally as a political commentator for several outlets including CBC Radio.

In 2008, the Supreme Court of Canada unanimously ruled in Mair's favour in Rafe Mair v. Kari Simpson, his appeal against a provincial court decision that he had defamed social activist Kari Simpson in his editorial in 1999.

Views 
Although he was traditionally considered a political conservative, Mair's views were moderate on certain issues; notably the environment and social welfare. Disillusioned with the three mainstream federal parties, he became a significant supporter of the Green Party urging people to vote for them in recent federal and provincial elections. Though he shied away from endorsing entire parties, he supported individual candidates, such as New Democrat candidate Svend Robinson in Vancouver Centre.

In 2009, Mair publicly stated that he voted NDP in that year's election. He had written why he thought that Premier Gordon Campbell failed British Columbians; among the reasons he cited were that the BC Liberals were destroying the publicly owned utility, BC Hydro, and were giving away British Columbia's water rights to international corporate interests.

Mair was the spokesperson for Save Our Rivers, a group organized to fight private run-of-the-river hydroelectric developments.

Personal life
Mair was a Type II diabetic and publicly announced his experiences with depression in 1995 while working as a broadcaster.

Mair authored several books on Canadian politics, including his memoirs, and was a regular columnist at the online newsmagazine The Tyee. He was a principal contributor to The Common Sense Canadian, a news and opinion site with a British Columbia focus until his death. He hosted a program called The Search with Rafe Mair on Joytv.

Mair died on 9 October 2017 in Vancouver at the age of 85.

Selected works
Canada, is anyone listening? (1998)  
Rants, raves and recollections (2000)  
Still Ranting: More Rants, Raves, and Recollections (2002) 
Rafe : a memoir (2004)  
Hard talk (2005)  
Over the Mountains: More Thoughts on Things that Matter (2006) 
I Remember Horsebuns (2015) 
Politically Incorrect: How Canada Lost its Way and the Simple Path Home (2017)

Awards
1977 – Queen Elizabeth II Coronation Anniversary Medal
1993 – B.C. Association of Broadcasters "Broadcast Performer of the Year"
1995 – Haig-Brown Award for Conservation work
1995 – Received prestigious Michener Award from the Governor-General of Canada for courageous journalism, the first radio broadcaster to do so (nominated on two other occasions)
1997 – BC Branch of the Canadian Mental Health Association "Media Person Of the Year"
1997 – National Canadian Mental Health Association Media Person of The Year (shared with Pamela Wallin)
1998 – BC Branch of the Canadian Mental Health Association "Media person of The Year"
2003 – Bruce Hutchison Award for Lifetime Achievement from the Jack Webster Foundation
2005 – Inducted into the Canadian Association of Broadcasters’ Hall of Fame
2005 – Named by readers poll of Georgia Straight (78,000 responses) as best talk show host in Vancouver

See also
Rafe Mair v. Kari Simpson

References

External links

1931 births
2017 deaths
British Columbia Social Credit Party MLAs
Canadian columnists
Canadian fishers
Canadian political commentators
Canadian political writers
Canadian talk radio hosts
Health ministers of British Columbia
Lawyers in British Columbia
Members of the Executive Council of British Columbia
People with mood disorders
Peter A. Allard School of Law alumni
Politicians from Vancouver
University of British Columbia alumni
Writers from Vancouver